Stoner Creek is a stream in Dolores County, Colorado, in the United States.

The creek was named for the rocky character of its bed.

See also
List of rivers of Colorado

References

Rivers of Dolores County, Colorado
Rivers of Montezuma County, Colorado
Rivers of Colorado